Landertinger is a surname. Notable people with the surname include:

Dominik Landertinger (born 1988), Austrian biathlete
Fritz Landertinger (1914–1943), Austrian canoeist